Bressack is a surname. Notable people with the surname include:

Gordon Bressack (1951–2019), American television writer 
James Cullen Bressack (born  1992), American film producer, screenwriter, and film director, son of Gordon